Himilco (fl. 5th century BCE), sometimes referred to as Himilco the Navigator, was a Carthaginian sailor.

Himilco may also refer to:
 Himilco (general) (died c. 396 BCE), Carthaginian soldier at the Battle of Messene
 Himilco (Punic War) (fl. c. 250 BCE), Carthaginian soldier, Alexon's commanding officer during the siege of Lilybaeum
 Himilco (fl. 3rd century BC) (died c.212 BC), Carthaginian soldier, general in Sicily during the Second Punic War